Ulrich Oehme (born 7 February 1960) is a German politician. He represents Alternative for Germany (AfD). Ulrich Oehme has served as a member of the Bundestag from the state of Saxony since 2017.

Life 
Oehme was born in Bischofswerda, Saxony. He became member of the bundestag after the 2017 German federal election. He is a member of the Committee on Economic Cooperation and Development.

References

External links 

 Bundestag biography 

1960 births
Living people
Members of the Bundestag for Saxony
Members of the Bundestag 2017–2021
Members of the Bundestag for the Alternative for Germany